The 2022 Bulgarian Cup Final was the final match of the 2021–22 Bulgarian Cup and the 82nd final of the Bulgarian Cup. The final originally should have been on 11 May 2022 at the Vasil Levski National Stadium in Sofia. On 28 April the date has been confirmed, but on the next day the Bulgarian Professional Football League and the Bulgarian Football Union announced a revised schedule, in which the game was set for 15 May 2022.

The clubs contesting the final were CSKA Sofia and Levski Sofia. This was the 17th occasion of the Eternal derby as a cup final and the first since 2005. For CSKA, this was the third consecutive final appearance and 35th overall, whereas for Levski, it was the first since 2018 and 38th overall. This was the 41st time both teams faced each other in the tournament's history.

Levski won the final by the score of 1−0, lifting a record 26th cup, their first since 2007, and ending a 13-year overall trophy drought, having last won the 2009 Bulgarian Supercup. They also booked a place in the second qualifying round of 2022–23 UEFA Europa Conference League. 

The final was the most attended match between two Bulgarian sides since the 1998 Bulgarian Cup Final.

Route to the Final

Match

Details

Notes

References 

Bulgarian Cup finals
2021–22 in Bulgarian football
PFC CSKA Sofia matches
PFC Levski Sofia matches
Bulgarian Cup Final